Bhagirath Choudhary (born 1 June 1964) is an Indian politician from Rajasthan. A member of the Bharatiya Janata Party, he respresents Ajmer in the Lok Sabha. From 2013 to 2018, he represented Kishangarh in Ajmer district in the Rajasthan Legislative Assembly. As Member of Legislative Assembly, he was Chairman of the Committee on Environment in 2015-16 and 2016-17.

References 

Living people
Lok Sabha members from Rajasthan
Bharatiya Janata Party politicians from Rajasthan
Rajasthan MLAs 2013–2018
India MPs 2019–present
1954 births